Silvio Treleani (29 September 1906 – 25 January 1980) was a sailor from Italy, who represented his country in the Snowbird in Los Angeles, United States.

References

External links
 

Italian male sailors (sport)
Sailors at the 1932 Summer Olympics – Snowbird
Olympic sailors of Italy
1907 births
1980 deaths